

Driftwood Estate is an Australian winery at Wilyabrup, in the Margaret River wine region of Western Australia.  Established by Tom and Helen Galapoulos in 1989 on what had previously been a country retreat, the winery immediately received acclaim when its first wine, a semillon produced in 1993, won a special commendation in a British competition. In 2009, leading Australian wine writer James Halliday rated Driftwood Estate as one of the best wineries in the Margaret River region.

See also

 Australian wine
 List of wineries in Western Australia
 Western Australian wine

References

Notes

Bibliography

External links
Driftwood Estate – official site

Companies established in 1989
Wilyabrup, Western Australia
Wineries in Western Australia
1989 establishments in Australia